Guido Pisanus is a Latin name that may refer to:

Guido Pisano (died 1149), a prelate and diplomat
Guido of Pisa (died 1169), a geographer